The 1912 Tasmanian state election was held on 30 April 1912

Retiring Members

Liberal
Edward Crowther MHA (Denison)
Thomas Hodgman MHA (Franklin)

House of Assembly
Sitting members are shown in bold text. Tickets that elected at least one MHA are highlighted in the relevant colour. Successful candidates are indicated by an asterisk (*).

Bass
Six seats were up for election. The Labor Party was defending two seats. The Liberal Party was defending four seats.

Darwin
Six seats were up for election. The Labor Party was defending four seats. The Liberal Party was defending two seats.

Denison
Six seats were up for election. The Labor Party was defending two seats. The Liberal Party was defending four seats.

Franklin
Six seats were up for election. The Labor Party was defending two seats. The Liberal Party was defending four seats.

Wilmot
Six seats were up for election. The Labor Party was defending one seat. The Liberal Party was defending five seats.

See also
 Members of the Tasmanian House of Assembly, 1909–1912
 Members of the Tasmanian House of Assembly, 1912–1913

References
Tasmanian Parliamentary Library

Candidates for Tasmanian state elections